This is a list of supporters of the Oxfordian theory of Shakespeare authorship, which was first promulgated in 1920.

 Percy Allen — journalist, theatre historian
 Mark Anderson — journalist, researcher, author, astrophysicist
 Charles Wisner Barrell — researcher, author
 Charles Beauclerk, Earl of Burford — writer
 Charles Sidney Beauclerk — Jesuit priest
Michael Delahoyde — professor of English, Washington State University 
 Louis P. Bénézet — American school reformer 
 Harry Blackmun — U.S. Supreme Court Justice
 Marjorie Bowen — British historian, biographer, novelist
 Gelett Burgess — author, critic, poet, artist
 John Byrne — British-born Canadian-American comic book artist and writer
 Michael Chiklis — actor<ref>Kevin Pollak's Chat Show #112 , 2011. Time reference: 01:16:30. Retrieved May 30, 2011.</ref>
 Montagu William Douglas — soldier and colonial administrator.
Ren Draya — professor of English & communications, Blackburn College 
 Roland Emmerich — film director, screenwriter, producer; producer and director of Anonymous (2011)
 William Farina — biographer, nonfiction researcher and author, essayist
 Bert Fields — lawyer and writer
 Sigmund Freud — pioneer of psychoanalysis
 Michael H. Hart — astrophysicist, author of The 100: A Ranking of the Most Influential Persons in History Warren Hope — academic, university English professor, author
 Christmas Humphreys — British barrister, judge, author, Buddhist scholar
 Jeremy Irons — actor
 Sir Derek Jacobi — Shakespearean actor, directorThorpe, Vanessa. "Who Was Shakespeare? That Is (Still) the Question: Campaign Revives Controversy of Bard's Identity." The Observer. 9 September 2007.
 Richard Kennedy — American children's book writer
Felicia Hardison Londré — curators’ professor of theatre at the University of Missouri-Kansas City 
Lynne Kositsky — Canadian author of poetry and young adult historical fiction
 J. Thomas Looney — British school teacher, researcher, author
 David McCullough — historian, author, biographer
 Paul Nitze — longtime high-ranking U.S. government official and Presidential advisor, ambassadorNitze argued the Oxfordian case for the 1992 Frontline three-hour video dialogue, Uncovering Shakespeare: An Update, chaired by William F. Buckley.
 Charlton Greenwood Ogburn — lawyer
 Charlton Ogburn — investigative journalist, researcher, author
 John Orloff — screenwriter
 Sir Roger Penrose — mathematician, Nobel Laureate in Physics
Anne Pluto — professor of literature and theatre, Lesley University 
Enoch Powell - politician 
Keanu Reeves - actor
 Gerald Henry Rendall — professor of Greek 
 Anne Rice — author
 Mark Rylance — Shakespearean actor and director, director of Shakespeare's Globe Theatre 1995–2005
Don Rubin — professor emeritus of theatre at York University in Toronto; Shakespeare Oxford Fellowship vice president
 Antonin Scalia — U.S. Supreme Court Justice
 Joseph Sobran — journalist, author, researcher
 John Paul Stevens — U.S. Supreme Court Justice
 Roger Stritmatter — professor of humanities at Coppin State University and the general editor of Brief Chronicles Peter A. Sturrock — British astrophysicist, Stanford University professor of applied physics, Arctowski Medalist, author of AKA Shakespeare: A Scientific Approach to the Authorship Question''
 Patrick Walker (40 Watt Sun) — musician, songwriter.
 Bernard Mordaunt Ward — military officer, author
 Alexander Waugh — writer
 Douglas Wilson -  CREC pastor, theologian, social critic 
Daniel L. Wright — Professor of English, Concordia University, Portland; Director of the Shakespeare Authorship Research Centre 
 Michael York — actor

Notes

 
British literature-related lists